Enaj (also Romanized as Enāj and Anāj; also known as Shahrak-e Shahīd Rejā’ī) is a town in Enaj Rural District, Qareh Chay District, Khondab County, Markazi Province, Iran. At the 2006 census, its population was 1,464, in 1400 families.

References 

Populated places in Khondab County